Allan Leigh Lawson (born 21 July 1945) is an English actor, director and writer.

Life and career
Lawson was born in Atherstone, Warwickshire. He initially studied at Mountview Academy of Theatre Arts before training further at the Royal Academy of Dramatic Art, Lawson has acted in film and television since the early 1970s, and has directed plays in the West End and on Broadway. He has worked with the National Theatre, Royal Shakespeare Company (RSC) and with film directors such as Roman Polanski and Franco Zeffirelli. He has been quoted as saying that the only time in his career when he didn't feel he should be somewhere else doing something else was when he was with the RSC. Lawson's portrayals in films include Bernardo in Brother Sun, Sister Moon (1972) and Alec d'Urberville in Tess (1979). He played the leading role as Alan Lomax in the television drama series Travelling Man (1984–85), and guest starred in television series such as The Duchess of Duke Street (1976), Disraeli (1978), Feuer und Schwert - Die Legende von Tristan und Isolde (1982), The Ray Bradbury Theatre (1988) and Silent Witness (2005–2007). He also guested, with his wife Twiggy, playing themselves in an episode of the comedy series, Absolutely Fabulous (2001).

In 1999 Lawson co-wrote and directed the musical If Love Were All, which tells of the friendship between Gertrude Lawrence and Noël Coward. The Dream: An Actor's Story, a theatrical memoir about the day-to-day life of a working actor, was published in September 2009.

Personal life
In 1976, Lawson and his first wife, Mondy, were divorced. He met the actress Hayley Mills in 1975, when they performed in London's West End in A Touch of Spring; the following year, they had a son, Jason. Lawson also served as a stepfather to Crispian Mills, Mills's son with director Roy Boulting. During that time, he appeared with Mills's father, John Mills, in the film The Devil's Advocate (1977). Lawson and Mills ended their relationship in the mid-1980s.

Lawson met the model Twiggy in 1984. In 1988, they both worked in the film Madame Sousatzka and were married on 23 September that year, in Tony Walton's back yard in Sag Harbor, Long Island. The couple reside in West London and also own a home in Southwold, Suffolk.

He adopted Twiggy's daughter, Carly, who took his surname. Lawson has played a large part in the lives of his children and of his nephew, Saul Dismont, who is the son of Lawson's sister and Bermuda politician Russell Dismont.

Partial filmography

 Brother Sun, Sister Moon (1972) - Bernardo
 Ghost Story (1974) - Robert
 QB VII (1974, TV Mini-Series) - Dix
 Percy's Progress (1974) - Percy Edward Anthony
 The God King (1974) - Kassapa
 Love Among the Ruins (1975, TV Movie) - Alfred Pratt
 The Tiger Lily (1975) - Michael
 The Duchess of Duke Street (1976, Episode: "For Love Or Money")
 Space: 1999 (1976, Episode: "One Moment of Humanity")
 The Devil's Advocate (1977) - Giacomo Nerone
 Golden Rendezvous (1977) - Tony Cerdan
 Tess (1979) - Alec d'Urberville
 Why Didn't They Ask Evans? (1980, TV Movie) - Roger Bassington-ffrench
 Hammer House of Horror (1980, Episode: "Charlie Boy") - Graham
 Fire and Sword (1982) - Mark
 Lace (1984, TV Mini-Series) - Count Charles de Chazalle
 Hammer House of Mystery and Suspense (1984, Episode: "Black Carrion") - Paul Taylor
 Sword of the Valiant: The Legend of Sir Gawain and the Green Knight (1984) - Humphrey
 Madame Sousatzka (1988) - Ronnie Blum
 Out of Depth (2000) - Tate
 Back to the Secret Garden (2000) - Sir Colin Craven
 Being Julia (2004) - Archie Dexter
 Casanova (2005) - Mother's Lover / Tito
 Silence Becomes You (2005) - Father
 Silent Witness: The Meaning of Death (2005) - Nikki's Father
 The Courageous Heart of Irena Sendler (2009, TV Movie) - Rabbi Rozenfeld
 The Red Tent (2014, TV Mini-Series) - Laban

Stage appearances
 Ivan Kaliayev, The Price of Justice, Mermaid Theatre, London, (1972).
 A Touch of Spring, with Hayley Mills, Comedy Theatre, London's West End, (1975–78).
 Aubrey Tanqueray, The Second Mrs. Tanqueray, Royal National Theatre (1981).
 Louis Dubedat, The Doctor's Dilemma, Greenwich Theatre, London, 1981
 Amnon, Yonadab, directed by Peter Hall, Royal National Theatre (1985).
 Antonio, The Merchant of Venice in London's West End and on Broadway (1989).
 Oberon, A Midsummer Night's Dream, produced by Adrian Noble, Royal Shakespeare Company, (1990).
 Loveless, The Relapse, Royal Shakespeare Company, (1996).
 Marc, Art, London's West End and UK Tour, (2002).
 Lloyd, Noises Off, London's West End and on Broadway (2003).
 Death and the Maiden, King's Head Theatre, London (2004).
 Nicholas Nickleby, Chichester Festival Theatre, (2006).
 Shoreditch Madonna, with Francesca Annis, Soho Theatre, (2006).
 Messerschmann, Ring Round the Moon, Playhouse Theatre, London, (2008)

Directed
 If Love Were All, (1999), opened off-Broadway at the Lucille Lortel Theatre with Twiggy as Gertrude Lawrence and Harry Groener as Noël Coward, written by Sheridan Morley & Leigh Lawson, directed by Leigh Lawson.
 The Restaurant, New York
 The Cherry Orchard, US
 Death and the Maiden, King's Head Theatre, Islington, (2004)
 Jack and the Beanstalk, Pantomime, Brighton Theatre Royal, (2005), starring Twiggy

References

External links

Fandango: Leigh Lawson filmography
United Agents
Image of Leigh Lawson and Twiggy

1945 births
Alumni of RADA
English male film actors
English male stage actors
English male television actors
Living people
People from Atherstone
Alumni of the Mountview Academy of Theatre Arts